Transmembrane protein 25 is a protein that in humans is encoded by the TMEM25 gene.

References

Further reading